Neil Oatley (born 12 June 1954) is a design and development director in Formula One teams.

Born in Britain, Oatley graduated from Loughborough University in 1976 with an automotive engineering degree. He worked briefly outside motor racing before joining the Williams team in 1977.  There he became one of many young engineers to have worked alongside Patrick Head early in their careers before moving on to other organisations.  Oatley worked as a draughtsman before becoming a race engineer for both Clay Regazzoni and Carlos Reutemann.

Oatley joined the McLaren team shortly after leaving FORCE and worked alongside John Barnard in the design office. After Gordon Murray replaced Barnard as technical director, Oatley was put in charge of the design of the naturally aspirated car for 1989—Steve Nichols having been appointed chief designer of the   1988 chassis—and remained chief designer after Murray moved to the new McLaren road car project.

Oatley continued to work as chief designer at McLaren until 2003, when he became executive director of engineering.

References
Profile at grandprix.com

Alumni of Loughborough University
Formula One designers
1954 births
Living people
McLaren people
English motorsport people
Williams Grand Prix Engineering